Dhrohi is a 1982 Indian Malayalam film, directed by P. Chandrakumar and produced by T. K. Balachandran. The film stars Prem Nazir, Jagathy Sreekumar, Jose Prakash and Menaka in the lead roles. The film has musical score by A. T. Ummer.

Cast
Prem Nazir
Jagathy Sreekumar
Jose Prakash
Menaka
M. G. Soman
Poojappura Ravi
Ravikumar
Swapna

Soundtrack
The music was composed by A. T. Ummer and the lyrics were written by Mankombu Gopalakrishnan.

References

External links
 

1982 films
1980s Malayalam-language films
Films directed by P. Chandrakumar